Ieldraan is an extinct genus of marine crocodyliform in the family Metriorhynchidae from the Jurassic (Callovian) period of England. The sole species in the genus is Ieldraan melkshanensis.

References

Late Jurassic crocodylomorphs of Europe
Middle Jurassic crocodylomorphs
Fossil taxa described in 2017
Prehistoric pseudosuchian genera
Prehistoric marine crocodylomorphs
Middle Jurassic genus first appearances
Thalattosuchians
Oxford Clay